Fusibacter paucivorans is a thiosulfate-reducing bacterium from the family Peptostreptococcaceae. It is the most studied species of the genus Fusibacter, isolated from oil-producing wells.

References

Bacteria described in 1999
Peptostreptococcaceae